The 2012 Slough Council election took place on 3 May 2012 to elect members of Slough Borough Council in England. This was on the same day as other 2012 United Kingdom local elections.

14 wards (one third of the council) were up for election.

After the election, the composition of the council was:

Labour                 35
Conservative     5
Liberal Democrats 1

References

2012 English local elections
2012
2010s in Berkshire